Susila Dharma International Association (SDIA) is a non-profit association that aims to relieve human suffering and promote just and sustainable development. With activities in 29 countries, SDIA has 21 voting and 41 associate members (development projects). It works by:

 Partnering and supporting grassroots, participatory development and humanitarian initiatives
 Empowering individuals and communities to engage in human, social and economic development
 Raising awareness of global issues and interdependence.

SDIA builds the capacity of its members to develop and sustain their organizations and projects. It provides training and coordinates technical, financial and human resources. It builds connections with donors and provides communication and information-sharing services. SDIA promotes awareness of key issues such as gender equality, children's rights, health care, sustainable livelihoods, and innovative and effective development practices.

Susila Dharma International Association (SDIA) is a US-registered non-profit organization (US Charitable tax No. 98-0156249) and holds special consultative status with the United Nations Economic and Social Council (ECOSOC), UNICEF and the Department of Public Information(DPI). SDIA is governed by an international board and by the decisions of voting members at the Annual General Meeting.

Background

SDIA was founded in 1968 and is an affiliate organization of the World Subud Association. 'Susila Dharma' can be translated as "guided from within to take action in the world."

Projects

SDIA supports projects related to health, community development, education and child development, the environment and sustainability. the organization's associate members are located in Australia, Colombia, the Democratic Republic of Congo, Ecuador, France, India, Indonesia, Mexico, Norway, Paraguay, Portugal, South Africa, the United Kingdom, Uruguay and the USA.

External links
Official site

Subud
Charities based in Virginia
Development charities based in the United States